Sebastian Schwager (born 4 January 1984 in Ansbach) is a German professional road bicycle racer.

Palmares 

 Mainfranken Tour - 1 stage & Overall (2006)
  U23 Road Race Champion (2005)
 3rd (2006)

External links 

1984 births
Living people
German male cyclists
People from Ansbach
Sportspeople from Middle Franconia
Cyclists from Bavaria
21st-century German people